A glave or glaive is a European pole weapon.

Glave, Glaves, GLAVE, or Glaive may also refer to:

People 
 Edward James Glave (1863–1895), English travel writer
 Matthew Glave (born 1963), American actor
 Thomas Glave (born 1964),  American author
 Marisa Glave Remy (born 1981), Peruvian politician
 Rory Glaves (born 1982), Canadian lacrosse player
 Ash Gutierrez (born 2005), American singer-songwriter known professionally as Glaive
 Lukas Rossander (born 1995), Danish professional Counter-Strike player known by his nickname gla1ve

Other 
 "Glaive," a fictional weapon in the 1983 film Krull, which is actually most similar to a chakram in style
 VkTrace, a software formerly known as "GLAVE"
 Glaveș, a river in Romania
 The Gordon Glaves Memorial Pathway, a portion of the Hamilton–Brantford–Cambridge Trails